Boro was a Formula One team from the Netherlands run by the brothers Bob and Rody Hoogenboom.

Their single car was built by the Ensign team, but was renamed Boro after their main sponsor, HB Bewaking, ended up as proprietor of the car after a legal dispute with Ensign owner Morris Nunn. The name is a portmanteau of the Hoogenboom brothers' first names, BOb and ROdy.

In the Dutch village of Bovenkerk (North Holland), the Hoogenboom brothers set up a factory to work on the N175. They entered a total of eight Grands Prix between 1976 and 1977, but failed to make a lasting impression. The team achieved finishes in only two events, the best being eighth place for Larry Perkins in the 1976 Belgian Grand Prix.

Complete Formula One World Championship results
(key)

References 

 Team Profile at Grand Prix Encyclopedia 
 Results from Formula1.com

1976 establishments in the Netherlands
1977 disestablishments in the Netherlands
Formula One constructors
Formula One entrants
Dutch auto racing teams
Dutch racecar constructors
Auto racing teams established in 1976
Auto racing teams disestablished in 1977